Bereguardo (Lombard: Balguàrt) is a comune (municipality) in the Province of Pavia in the Italian region Lombardy, located about  southwest of Milan and about  northwest of Pavia.

Bereguardo borders the following municipalities: Borgo San Siro, Motta Visconti, Torre d'Isola, Trivolzio, Trovo, Vigevano, Zerbolò.

The remnants of the moated 14th-century Castello di Bereguardo are now used for municipal offices.

People
 
 
Maddalena Carini (1917–1998), Italian Servant of God

References

Cities and towns in Lombardy